The San Francisco River (Spanish, Río San Francisco) is a river of Argentina. It is a tributary of the Bermejo River.

See also
List of rivers of Argentina

References

 Rand McNally, The New International Atlas, 1993.

Rivers of Argentina
Tributaries of the Paraguay River
Rivers of Jujuy Province
Rivers of Salta Province